Calculus Made Easy is a book on infinitesimal calculus originally published in 1910 by Silvanus P. Thompson, considered a classic and elegant introduction to the subject. The original text continues to be available as of 2008 from Macmillan and Co., but a 1998 update by Martin Gardner is available from St. Martin's Press which provides an introduction; three preliminary chapters explaining functions, limits, and derivatives; an appendix of recreational calculus problems; and notes for modern readers. Gardner changes "fifth form boys" to the more American sounding (and gender neutral) "high school students," updates many now obsolescent mathematical notations or terms, and uses American decimal dollars and cents in currency examples.

Calculus Made Easy ignores the use of limits with its epsilon-delta definition, replacing it with a method of approximating (to arbitrary precision) directly to the correct answer in the infinitesimal spirit of Leibniz, now formally justified in modern nonstandard analysis and smooth infinitesimal analysis.

The original text is now in the public domain under US copyright law (although Macmillan's copyright under UK law is reproduced in the 2008 edition from St. Martin's Press). It can be freely accessed on Project Gutenberg.

Further reading 
 Nature, Vol. 86, No. 2158 (March 9, 1911), p. 41. . A review of the first edition. Internet Archive; Google Books.
 Carl Linderholm, College Mathematics Journal, Vol. 31, No. 1 (January, 2000), pp. 77-79. A review of Silvanus P. Thompson, revised by Martin Gardner, Calculus Made Easy (St. Martin's Press, 1998).

External links 

 Silvanus P. Thompson, Calculus Made Easy: Being a Very-Simplest Introduction to Those Beautiful Methods of Reckoning which Are Generally Called by the Terrifying Names of the Differential Calculus and the Integral Calculus (New York: MacMillan Company, 2nd Ed., 1914). Also available as the (London: MacMillan and Co., Limited, 2nd Ed., 1914) printing, which isn't published under Thompson's name, but instead has the byline of "by F.R.S." (i.e., Fellow of the Royal Society).
  (Re-typeset in LaTeX)
 
 Calculus Made Easy online
 
 Calculus Made Easy on YouTube

1910 non-fiction books
Works by Martin Gardner
Mathematics textbooks